The zentner (German Zentner, from Latin centenarius, derived from centum meaning "hundred") is a name for a unit of mass which was used predominantly in Germany, Austria, and Switzerland, although it was also sometimes used in the United Kingdom – for example, as a measure of the weight of certain crops including hops for beer production – and similar units were used in Scandinavia. Like the notion of hundredweight, the zentner is the weight of 100 units, where the value of the unit depends on the time and location.

See also
 German obsolete units of measurement
Quintal (centner)

References
Notes

Units of mass
Obsolete units of measurement

de:Zentner